Lost Creek is a stream in Cass County in the U.S. state of Missouri. It is a tributary of the South Grand River.

Lost Creek was named for the fact it is a losing stream on part of its course.

See also
List of rivers of Missouri

References

Rivers of Cass County, Missouri
Rivers of Missouri